Stebbinsville is an unincorporated community in the town of Porter, Rock County, Wisconsin, United States. In 1867, Harrison Stebbins, farmer and politician, built a grist mill in Stebbinsville and later served as chairman of the Porter Town Board. Stebbinsville was named in his honor.

Notes

Unincorporated communities in Rock County, Wisconsin
Unincorporated communities in Wisconsin